is a railway station located in the city of Jōetsu, Niigata, Japan operated by the third-sector operator Hokuetsu Express.

Lines

tation layout
The station has two elevated opposed side platforms with the station building underneath. The station is unattended.

Platforms

Adjacent stations

History
The station opened on 22 March 1997 with the opening of the Hokuhoku Line.

Passenger statistics
In fiscal 2016, the station was used by an average of 155 passengers daily (boarding passengers only).

Surroundings area

Hakusan Shrine
Yasuzuka High School

References

External links

 Hokuetsu Express station information 

Railway stations in Niigata Prefecture
Railway stations in Japan opened in 1997
Stations of Hokuetsu Express
Jōetsu, Niigata